El Clásico  is the name given to any football match between Real Madrid Club de Fútbol and Futbol Club Barcelona. 

The term clásico has also become used for several other sports rivalries. Some of which include:

 Europe

El Viejo Clásico, the Athletic Bilbao - Real Madrid CF rivalry
Athletic–Barcelona clásico, Athletic Bilbao - FC Barcelona rivalry
El Clásico (basketball), the basketball game between Real Madrid Baloncesto and FC Barcelona Bàsquet
Liverpool F.C.–Manchester United F.C. rivalry, Classic of England or North West Derby, the Liverpool F.C. - Manchester United F.C. rivalry
An Clasaiceach, Classic of Ireland, Bohemian F.C. - Shamrock Rovers F.C.
Le Classique, Classic of France, the Paris Saint-Germain F.C. - Olympique de Marseille rivalry
Der Klassiker, Classic of Germany, the Borussia Dortmund - FC Bayern Munich rivalry
Derby d'Italia, Classic of Italy, the Inter Milan - Juventus F.C. rivalry
De Klassieker, Classic of the Netherlands, the AFC Ajax - Feyenoord rivalry
O Clássico, Classic of Portugal, the S.L. Benfica - FC Porto rivalry
Old Firm, Classic of Scotland, the Celtic F.C. - Rangers F.C. rivalry
Klasychne derby, Classic of Ukraine, the FC Dynamo Kyiv - FC Shakhtar Donetsk rivalry

 North America

Al Classico, the former rivalry between Cavalry FC and FC Edmonton
El Clásico Angelino, the Los Angeles Galaxy - Chivas USA rivalry (Los Angeles, USA)
California Clásico, the Los Angeles Galaxy - San Jose Earthquakes derby (California, USA)
Canadian Classique, the CF Montréal - Toronto FC rivalry
Clásico Capitalino, the América - Pumas UNAM derby (Mexico City, Mexico)
El Clásico Chapín, the C.S.D. Comunicaciones and C.S.D. Municipal derby (Guatemala City, Guatemala)
Clásico Joven, the América - Cruz Azul derby (Mexico City, Mexico)
Clásico Regiomontano, the Rayados de Monterrey - Tigres UANL derby (Monterrey, Mexico)
Clásico Tapatío, the Chivas de Guadalajara - Atlas derby (Guadalajara, Mexico)
El Súper Clásico (Mexico), the América - Guadalajara rivalry (Mexico)
Superclasico Hondureño, the Motagua - Olimpia derby (Tegucigalpa, Honduras)
Celtics–Lakers rivalry, the Boston Celtics - Los Angeles Lakers Classic of the National Basketball Association (USA)

 South America

Chilean Super Clásico, the Colo Colo - Universidad de Chile derby (Santiago, Chile)
Clásico del Astillero, the Barcelona - Emelec derby (Guayaquil, Ecuador)
Clássico dos Milhões, the Flamengo -  Vasco da Gama derby (Rio de Janeiro, Brazil)
Clássico Majestoso, the São Paulo - Corinthians derby (São Paulo, Brazil)
Paraguayan Superclásico, the Olimpia - Cerro Porteño derby (Asunción, Paraguay)
Peruvian Clásico, the Alianza Lima - Universitario de Deportes derby (Lima, Perú)
Superclásico, the Boca Juniors - River Plate derby (Buenos Aires, Argentina)
Uruguayan Clásico, the Nacional - Peñarol derby (Montevideo, Uruguay)

 Asia

Indonesian Superclásico, the Persija Jakarta – Persib Bandung derby (Indonesia)
Iraqi El Clásicos, the derbies between Al-Quwa Al-Jawiya, Al-Shorta, Al-Talaba and Al-Zawraa (Baghdad, Iraq)
Manila Clasico, Barangay Ginebra San Miguel – San Mig Coffee Mixers (Manila, Philippines)
Saudi El Clasico, Al Ittihad – Al Hilal derby
Chennai Super Kings-Mumbai Indians rivalry also  known as El Clasico of Indian Premier League or el clasico of cricket, IP-L clasico,Super Indian Derby.  The match is played between Chennai Super Kings and Mumbai Indians  (Chennai and Mumbai, India)
Kolkata Derby, Mohun Bagan AC – SC East Bengal  (Kolkata, India) known as  fiercest football  rivalry in asia  &  first football  rivalry in asia 

 Oceania

Crusaders – Blues rivalry also known as El Clasico of New Zealand Rugby or El Clasico of Modern Rugby, New Zealand Derby. Match is played between Crusaders and Blues (Auckland and Christchurch, New Zealand)
 South Sydney Rabbitohs – Sydney Roosters rivalry, the El Clasico equivalent of New South Wales and Australian rugby league.
 Queensland Derby, the El Clasico of rugby league in Queensland National Rugby League clubs, the Brisbane Broncos and North Queensland Cowboys

 Other uses

Snow Clasico – Name coined by American sports media to refer to a 2014 FIFA World Cup qualification – CONCACAF Fourth Round match between the United States and Costa Rica played under snowy conditions on 22 March 2013

See also

El clásico (film),  a 2015 Iraqi-Norwegian film